Monica is the designation of a small French sounding rocket. It was intended as a cheaper counterpart to the relatively expensive Veronique rockets. It was built in several versions, which were between 3.05 and 6.27 m long and had a takeoff weight between 62 and 154 kg. Monica was a 3-stage rocket, with all stages burning solid fuel. The first stage delivered 450 daN (decanewtons) for 3 seconds and the two upper stages deliver 50 daN for 15 and 5.5 seconds, respectively. It was launched several times between 1955 and 1962 at the CIEES launch site in Hammaguir, French Algeria, and the Ile de Levant site in France. The Monica design process encountered a number of difficulties, leading to many failed tests and the early cancellation of the program in 1962. However, elements of its design were later incorporated into more successful ONERA test vehicles.

References

Sounding rockets of France